Tillotson is both a surname and a given name. Notable people with the name include:

 John Tillotson (1630–1694), Archbishop of Canterbury
 Thomas Tillotson (1750–1832), American politician
 Robert L. Tillotson (1786–1878), American lawyer and politician
 Lee Stephen Tillotson (1874–1957), American military officer 
 Stephen Tillotson (1884-?), English footballer
 Roy Tillotson (1891–1962), American coach
 Neil Tillotson (1898–2001), American inventor
 Joseph Wirt Tillotson (1905–1959), American artist, also known by his pulp artist name Robert Fuqua
 Thad Tillotson (1940–2012), American baseball player
 Pete Tillotson (1936), American basketball player
 Johnny Tillotson (1938), American singer and songwriter
 Maurice Tillotson (1944), New Zealand footballer
 Giles Tillotson (1960), British historian
 Mary Tillotson (fl. 1970), American broadcast journalist and media lecturer
 Constance Tillotson (21st century), American actor and film director

Given name
 Tillotson Terrell (1785-1838), American pioneer, one of the first twenty settlers of Ridgeville Township

Other uses
 Huston–Tillotson University, located in Austin, Texas, United States
 Tillotson Manufacturing Company, maker of carburetors and other similar parts
Tillotson Avenue, a Street located in the Eastchester section of the Bronx.

References